Let Us Be Gay is a 1930 American pre-Code romantic comedy-drama film produced and distributed by MGM. It was directed by Robert Z. Leonard and stars Norma Shearer. It was filmed concurrently with and based upon the 1929 play by Rachel Crothers starring Tallulah Bankhead, which ran for 128 performances at London's Lyric Theater. Critics generally preferred Tallulah's rendition to Shearer's.

Plot

Housewife Kitty Brown (Norma Shearer) doesn't spend much time on her personal appearance.  She is devoted to her husband Bob (Rod La Rocque).  Kitty spends all her time seeing that Bob has everything he needs. Bob is embarrassed to be seen with his wife because he considers her dowdy and he doesn't like the homemade clothes she wears.

Kitty gets a shock when Bob's latest girlfriend, Helen, shows up at their home.  Kitty is polite to Helen and pretends that she has known about the affair all along but secretly she is broken-hearted.  She excuses herself to go to her room and cry. When she refuses to accept Bob's apology, he leaves, and their marriage is over.

Three years later, Bob is courting Diane (Sally Eilers).  Diane's grandmother, Mrs. Bouccicault (Marie Dressler), is a leader in local society and disapproves of the match.  Mrs. Bouccicault invites Kitty for the weekend.  Kitty is now a fashionable, very attractive woman.  Mrs. Bouccicault hopes to use Kitty to break Diane and Bob up.

Mrs. Bouccicault asks Kitty to steal a gentleman away from her granddaughter so Kitty flirts with each arriving male guest in turn assuming that each is the gentleman in question.

Bob arrives and is surprised by Kitty's appearance.  They pretend to meet for the first time.    The other weekend guests, including Townley (Gilbert Emery), Madge (Hedda Hopper), and Wallace (Tyrell Davis), are baffled by the way Bob and Kitty behave around each other. Kitty continues to flirt with the male guests.  She speaks disdainfully of marriage and makes it clear she is happily divorced.  Diane is engaged to Bruce (Raymond Hackett), who is also a guest.  Bruce loves Diane and is pained to see her with Bob.

Townley goes to the terrace outside Kitty's room.  She flirts with him.  When Bob knocks on the door, Townley hides.  Bob begs Kitty to marry him again.  Bob hears a sneeze and discovers Townley hiding in the bathroom.  He leaves through the terrace only to find Wallace waiting.  Wallace has brought Kitty a poem.  Disgusted and angry, Bob leaves.  A few minutes later Mrs. Bouccicault comes to Kitty's room to announce that Bob has just become engaged to Diane.

The next day, Bob is upset to overhear Kitty making plans for a yachting trip with Townley.  Kitty plans on leaving immediately, but her nanny shows up with Kitty and Bob's children.  The children are overjoyed to see their father.

Bob tells Diane he still feels he is married to Kitty.  Diane breaks up with Bob.  Kitty says she doesn't want him either.  She says goodbye to Bob.  He begs for another chance.  Again, he asks her to marry him.  She tearfully tells him she still loves him and she asks him to take her back.

Cast
Norma Shearer - Mrs. Katherine Brown
Marie Dressler - Mrs. Bouccy Bouccicault
Rod La Rocque - Bob Brown
Gilbert Emery - 'Towney' Townley
Hedda Hopper - Madge Livingston
Raymond Hackett - Bruce Keane
Sally Eilers - Diane
Tyrell Davis - Wallace Granger
Wilfred Noy - Whitman, the Butler
Sybil Grove - Perkins, a Maid

Home media
The film was released on DVD through the Warner Archive Collection.

Production
The film was shot quickly (in 26 days) due to Norma Shearer's pregnancy. A French-language version of the film, Soyons gais, was filmed in 1931, directed by Arthur Robison, and stars Lili Damita, Adolphe Menjou, and Françoise Rosay.

References

External links
 
 
Let Us Be Gay lobby and foreign posters
 alternative lobby poster

1930 films
1930 comedy-drama films
American comedy-drama films
American black-and-white films
Films directed by Robert Z. Leonard
American films based on plays
Metro-Goldwyn-Mayer films
1930s English-language films
1930s American films